is a dam in Ibigawa, Gifu Prefecture, Japan, completed in 1953.

References 

Dams in Gifu Prefecture
Dams completed in 1953